James Norman Beaver Jr. (born August 12, 1950) is an American actor, writer, and film historian. He is most familiar to worldwide audiences as Bobby Singer in Supernatural. He also played Whitney Ellsworth on the HBO Western drama series Deadwood, which brought him acclaim and a Screen Actors Guild Awards nomination for Ensemble Acting, and Sheriff Shelby Parlow on the FX series Justified. His memoir Life's That Way was published in April 2009.

Early life
Beaver was born in Laramie, Wyoming, the son of Dorothy Adell (née Crawford) (1928-2019) and James Norman Beaver (1924–2004), a minister. His father was of English and French heritage; the family name was originally de Beauvoir, and Beaver is a distant cousin of author and philosopher Simone de Beauvoir and Pennsylvania governor General James A. Beaver. Beaver's mother has Cherokee, German, and Scottish ancestry, and is a descendant of three-time U.S. Attorney General John J. Crittenden.

Although his parents' families had both long been in Texas, Beaver was born in Laramie, as his father was doing graduate work in accounting at the University of Wyoming. Returning to Texas, Beaver Sr. worked as an accountant and as a minister for the Church of Christ in Fort Worth, Crowley, Dallas, and Grapevine. For most of Beaver's youth, his family lived in Irving, Texas, even while his father preached in surrounding communities. He and his three younger sisters (Denise, Reneé, and Teddlie) all attended Irving High School, where he was a classmate of ZZ Top drummer Frank Beard,<ref>Stoddard, Carol, #Throwback Thursday:  Famous People from Irving, https://www.irvingtexas.com/blog/list/post/throwback-thursday-famous-people-from-irving/, retrieved July 6, 2022</ref> but he transferred in his senior year to Fort Worth Christian Academy, from which he graduated in 1968. He also took courses at Fort Worth Christian College. Later, he attended Oklahoma Christian College. Despite having appeared in some elementary school plays, he showed no particular interest in an acting career, but immersed himself in film history and expressed a desire for a career as a writer, publishing a few short stories in his high school anthology.

Military service and education
Fewer than two months after his graduation from high school, Beaver followed several of his close friends into the United States Marine Corps. Following basic training at Marine Corps Recruit Depot San Diego, Beaver was trained there as a microwave radio relay technician. He served at the Marine Corps Base Twentynine Palms and at Marine Corps Base Camp Pendleton before being transferred to the 1st Marine Division near Da Nang, South Vietnam in 1970. He served as a radio operator at an outlying detachment of the 1st Marine Regiment, then as supply chief for the division communications company. He returned to the U.S. in 1971 and was discharged as Corporal (E-4), though he remained active in the Marine Reserve until 1976.

Upon his release from active duty in 1971, Beaver returned to Irving, and worked briefly for Frito-Lay as a corn-chip dough mixer. He entered what is now Oklahoma Christian University, where he became interested in theatre. He made his true theatrical debut in a small part in The Miracle Worker. The following year, he transferred to Central State University (now known as the University of Central Oklahoma). He performed in numerous plays in college and supported himself as a cabdriver, a movie projectionist, a tennis-club maintenance man, and an amusement-park stuntman at Frontier City. He also worked as a newscaster and hosted jazz and classical music programs on radio station KCSC. During his college days, he also began to write, completing several plays as well as his first book, on actor John Garfield, while still a student. Beaver graduated with a degree in oral communications in 1975. He briefly pursued graduate studies, but soon returned to Irving, Texas.

Career

Beaver made his professional stage debut in October 1972, while still a college student, in Rain, from W. Somerset Maugham's short story, at the Oklahoma Theatre Center in Oklahoma City, Oklahoma. After returning to Texas, he performed extensively in local theatre in the Dallas area, supporting himself as a film cleaner at a 16 mm film rental firm and as a stagehand for the Dallas Ballet. He joined the Shakespeare Festival of Dallas in 1976, performing in numerous productions. In 1979, he was commissioned by Actors Theatre of Louisville to write the first of three plays for that company (Spades, Sidekick and Semper Fi), and was twice a finalist in the theatre's national Great American Play Contest (for Once Upon a Single Bound and Verdigris). Along with plays, he continued writing for film journals and for several years was a columnist, critic, and feature writer for the National Board of Review of Motion Pictures magazine Films in Review.

Moving to New York City in 1979, Beaver worked steadily onstage in stock and on tour, simultaneously writing plays and researching a biography of actor George Reeves. He continues to pursue this project between acting jobs. He appeared in starring roles in such plays as The Hasty Heart and The Rainmaker in Birmingham, Alabama and The Lark in Manchester, New Hampshire, and toured the country as Macduff in Macbeth and in The Last Meeting of the Knights of the White Magnolia. During this period, he ghostwrote the book Movie Blockbusters for critic Steven Scheuer.

In 1983, he moved to Los Angeles, California to continue research on his biography of George Reeves. He worked for a year as the film archivist for the Variety Arts Center. Following a reading of his play Verdigris, he was asked to join the prestigious Theatre West company in Hollywood, where he continues as an actor and playwright to this day. Verdigris was produced to positive reviews in 1985 and Beaver was signed by the Triad Artists agency. He immediately began to work writing episodes of television series including Alfred Hitchcock Presents (he received a 1987 CableACE Award nomination for his very first TV script for this show), Tour of Duty and Vietnam War Story. He also worked occasionally in small roles in films and television.

The 1988 Writers Guild of America strike fundamentally altered the freelance television writing market, and Beaver's television writing career came to an abrupt halt. A chance meeting led to his being cast as the best friend of star Bruce Willis in Norman Jewison's drama about Vietnam veterans, In Country, and his acting career began flourishing where his writing career had faltered. Beaver was the only actual Vietnam veteran among the principal cast of In Country.

Subsequently, he has appeared in many popular films, including Sister Act, Sliver, Bad Girls, Adaptation., Magnolia and The Life of David Gale. He starred in the television series Thunder Alley as the comic sidekick to Ed Asner, and as homicide cop Earl Gaddis on Reasonable Doubts. He was also French Stewart's sullen boss Happy Doug on the sitcom 3rd Rock from the Sun.

In 2002, Beaver was cast as one of the stars of the ensemble Western drama Deadwood in the role of Whitney Ellsworth, a goldminer whom he often described as "Gabby Hayes with Tourette syndrome". Ellsworth went from being a filth-covered reprobate to marrying the richest woman in town and becoming a beloved and stalwart figure in the community. Originally Ellsworth did not have a first name, but when it became necessary to provide one, Beaver requested he be named Whitney Ellsworth, after the producer of George Reeves's Adventures of Superman. He continued his long research for the Reeves biography, and in 2005 served as the historical and biographical consultant on the theatrical feature film about Reeves's death, Hollywoodland.

Beaver joined the cast of the HBO drama John from Cincinnati in 2006, while simultaneously playing the recurring roles of Bobby Singer on Supernatural and Carter Reese on another HBO drama Big Love, appearing at least once a season on Supernatural. He then took on the role of Sheriff Charlie Mills in the CBS drama Harper's Island. He recurred as the gun dealer Lawson on Breaking Bad and its prequel Better Call Saul, and played Sheriff Shelby Parlow for three seasons on FX's Justified.

Following his acclaimed work in Justified, Beaver had a starring role in Guillermo del Toro's gothic ghost story feature film, Crimson Peak, in a part del Toro wrote for him. He also had roles in the feature films The Frontier and Billy Boy.

His memoir about the year after his wife's 2003 lung cancer diagnosis, titled Life's That Way, was purchased in a preemptive bid by Putnam/Penguin publishers in the fall of 2007. Prior to publication in April, 2009, it was chosen for the Barnes & Noble Discover Great New Writers program for 2009.

His performance in The Silence of Bees won him the Best Actor Award at the 2010 New York Film and Video Festival.

Beaver was nominated for Best Guest Performance in a Drama by the Broadcast Television Journalists' Association Critics' Choice Awards in 2013, for his performance as Sheriff Shelby Parlow on Justified.

He wrote and directed the short film Night Riders (2013), based upon his play of the same title.

In 2014, he was given the Lifetime Merit Award of the Idyllwild International Festival of Cinema.

Beaver studied acting with Clyde Ventura and Academy Award-winning actor Maximilian Schell.

In March 2015, Theatre West presented a 30th anniversary revival of Beaver's play Verdigris, with Beaver in a starring role.

Actress Maureen Stapleton played the leading role in a workshop of Beaver's play Verdigris in 1985 at the Berkshire Theatre Festival. In June, 2016, Beaver returned to the Festival to play Big Daddy in Tennessee Williams's Cat on a Hot Tin Roof.

Since 2018, Beaver has portrayed Secretary of Defense (and U.S. presidential candidate) Robert Singer on the Amazon series The Boys, produced by Eric Kripke, creator of Supernatural. Beaver's characters on The Boys and Supernatural share the same name.

In March 2023, he reprised his role as Bobby Singer in The Winchesters spinoff series.

Personal life
For several years after his 1983 move to California, Beaver shared a house with character actor Hank Worden, whom he considered a close friend and surrogate grandfather. He became friends with Worden as a child, after writing him a fan letter that sparked a lengthy correspondence between them. 

During college, Beaver married a fellow student, Debbie Young, in August 1973. They separated four months later but did not divorce until 1976.

In 1989, after four years of dating, Beaver married actress and casting director Cecily Adams, daughter of comic actor and voiceover artist Don Adams. Their daughter was born in 2001. Adams, though a non-smoker, died of lung cancer on March 3, 2004.

Beaver began a relationship in 2016 with actress and singer Sarah Spiegel. They were married on June 20, 2019.  Beaver filed for divorce from Spiegel on August 24, 2022, citing "irreconcilable differences."

Filmography

Film

Television

Online

Literary works

BooksJohn Garfield: His Life and Films (1978)Movie Blockbusters (with Steven Scheuer) (1982, revised edition 1983)Life's That Way: A Memoir (2009)

FictionThe Afternoon Blood Show, Alfred Hitchcock's Mystery Magazine, April 29, 1981

PlaysThe Cop and the Anthem (adapted from the short story by O. Henry) (1973)Once Upon a Single Bound (1974)As You Like It, or Anything You Want To, Also Known as Rotterdam and Parmesan Are Dead (1975)The Ox-Bow Incident (adapted from the novel by Walter Van Tilburg Clark) (1978)Spades (1979)Sidekick (1981)Semper Fi (1984)Verdigris (1985)Truth, Justice, and the Texican Way (1986)Pressing Engagements (1990)Mockingbird (2003)Night Riders (2006)The American Way (2011)Whigs, Pigs, and Greyhounds (2011)Lettering (2013)

Magazine articles
"John Wayne", Films in Review, May 1977
"George Raft", Films in Review, April 1978
"John Carradine", Films in Review, October 1979
"James Stewart", Films in Review, October 1980
"Steve McQueen", Films in Review, August–September 1981
"Frank Perry", Films in Review, November 1981
"Strother Martin", Films in Review, November 1982
"Ad Glib" (regular column). Films in Review,'' November 1981 – December 1983

See also

References

External links

Bio at HBO.com 
Life's That Way
Interview Jim Beaver

American male film actors
American male stage actors
American male television actors
United States Marine Corps personnel of the Vietnam War
Living people
Male actors from Texas
Male actors from Wyoming
People from Irving, Texas
People from Laramie, Wyoming
United States Marine Corps reservists
United States Marines
University of Central Oklahoma alumni
Writers from Texas
Writers from Wyoming
1950 births
20th-century American dramatists and playwrights
20th-century American male actors
21st-century American male actors